Garth Greenwell (born March 19, 1978) is an American novelist, poet, literary critic, and educator. He has published the novella Mitko (2011) and the novels What Belongs to You (2016) and Cleanness (2020). He has also published stories in The Paris Review and A Public Space and writes criticism for The New Yorker and The Atlantic.

In 2013, Greenwell returned to the United States after living in Bulgaria to attend the University of Iowa Writers' Workshop as an Arts Fellow.

Early life
Garth Greenwell was born in Louisville, Kentucky, on March 19, 1978, and graduated from Interlochen Arts Academy in Interlochen, Michigan, in 1996. He studied voice at the Eastman School of Music, then transferred to earn a BA degree in Literature with a minor in Lesbian and Gay Studies from the State University of New York at Purchase in 2001, where he served as a contributing editor for In Posse Review and received the 2000 Grolier Poetry Prize. He received his MFA from Washington University in St. Louis, an MA in English and American Literature from Harvard University, and also spent three years on Ph.D. coursework there.

Career
Greenwell taught English at Greenhills, a private high school in Ann Arbor, Michigan, and at the American College of Sofia in Bulgaria; the school is famous for being the oldest American educational institution outside the US. His frequent book reviews in the literary journal West Branch transitioned into a yearly column called "To a Green Thought: Garth Greenwell on Poetry."

Greenwell's first novella, Mitko, won the Miami University Press Novella Prize and was a finalist for the Edmund White Debut Fiction Award as well as the Lambda Award. His work has appeared in Yale Review, Boston Review, Salmagundi, Michigan Quarterly Review, and Poetry International, among others.

His debut novel, What Belongs to You, was called the "first great novel of 2016" by Publishers Weekly. His second novel, Cleanness, was published in January 2020 and well received by critics.

Greenwell has received the Grolier Prize, the Rella Lossy Award, an award from the Dorothy Sargent Rosenberg Foundation, and the Bechtel Prize from the Teachers & Writers Collaborative. He was the 2008 John Atherton Scholar for Poetry at the Bread Loaf Writers' Conference.

LGBT rights advocacy in Bulgaria
In its article "Of LGBT, Life and Literature," the English-language weekly newspaper Sofia Echo credits Greenwell's publications with bringing much needed attention to the LGBT experience in Bulgaria and to other English-speaking audiences through various broadcasts, interviews, blog posts, and reviews.

Bibliography

Novels

Anthologies (edited) 
 Kink, co-edited with R.O. Kwon. Simon & Schuster. 2021.

Short fiction 
Stories

Essays and reporting

Notes

References

External links 
 
Paris Review interview, 2020.

1978 births
Living people
21st-century American novelists
21st-century American poets
American male novelists
American male poets
American gay writers
Harvard Graduate School of Arts and Sciences alumni
American LGBT novelists
American LGBT poets
State University of New York at Purchase alumni
The New Yorker people
Washington University in St. Louis alumni
Writers from Louisville, Kentucky
PEN/Faulkner Award for Fiction winners
Novelists from Kentucky
Iowa Writers' Workshop alumni
21st-century American male writers
Gay poets